This article lists some of the events from 2015 related to the Netherlands.

Incumbents
 Monarch – Willem-Alexander
 Prime Minister – Mark Rutte (VVD)
 Speaker of the House of Representatives – Anouchka van Miltenburg (VVD, resigned on 12 December), Khadija Arib (PvdA, Acting Speaker)
 President of the Senate – Ankie Broekers-Knol (VVD)

Events

January
8 January: After the Charlie Hebdo shooting, over 18,000 demonstrators for freedom of speech joined events around the Netherlands, following the call of the Mayors of Amsterdam, Rotterdam, Utrecht and others; many Dutch Government members joined the demonstrations
29 January: A man holding a fake gun tried to take over the Nederlandse Omroep Stichting (NOS) news studio in Hilversum because he wanted to tell the audience about a conspiracy theory of his; he was arrested later that evening by the police without hurting anyone.

February
 2 February: Opening of the Barneveld Zuid railway station
 9 February: The political party Denk is founded by MPs Tunahan Kuzu and Selçuk Öztürk
 12–15 February: The 2015 World Single Distance Speed Skating Championships take place in the Thialf Arena in Heerenveen

March
 15 March: Ivo Opstelten and Fred Teeven (VVD) resign from the Ministry of Security and Justice.
 18 March: Provincial and Water board elections are held.

April
 18 April: PSV Eindhoven wins the 2014–15 Eredivisie

May
 12 May: Jesse Klaver takes over as Leader of GroenLinks

June
 9 June: Senate election, 2015

July

August
 19–23 August: SAIL Amsterdam

September
 8 September: The VU University Medical Center in Amsterdam is fully evacuated after parts of the hospital were flooded because of a burst in a major water pipeline

October
 6 October: Locals demonstrate in Oranje, Drenthe to oppose the instalment an asylum seekers centre in the village
 14–18 October: Amsterdam Dance Event

November

December
 16 December: Around 2,000 people protested and rioted against plans announced by the town council to construct a centre for 1,500 asylum seekers in the 2015 Geldermalsen riot.

See also
 2014–15 Eredivisie
 Netherlands in the Eurovision Song Contest 2015
 Netherlands in the Junior Eurovision Song Contest 2015
 List of Dutch Top 40 number-one singles of 2015

See also
2015 in Dutch television
2014–15 Eredivisie

References

 
Years of the 21st century in the Netherlands
Netherlands
Netherlands
2010s in the Netherlands